Plateau South Senatorial District covers six local governments namely, Langtang North, Langtang South, Mikang, Qua’anpan, Shendam, and Wase.

List of senators representing Plateau South

References 

Plateau State
Senatorial districts in Nigeria